The South Campus Historic District is a historic district in Chico, California which was named to the National Register of Historic Places in 1991 through efforts of the Chico Heritage Association. The district is situated entirely within the South Campus Neighborhood. The historical district extends from Salem Street to Cherry Street, and from West Second Street to West Sixth Street. Whereas, the neighborhood extends from West Second Street south to West Ninth Street and west from Salem Street all the way to the city limits, which, in that area, is called the "Green Line." The South Campus Neighborhood Association represents the interests of the neighborhood to the community. There are several fraternity and sorority houses in the area, and the city has designated the South Campus Fraternity/Sorority Overlay Zone which is largely contiguous with the neighborhood and district.

Historically, this area was the first residential area established in the city. The area was surveyed for laying out streets in 1860. South Campus is home of the Stansbury House, the Southern Pacific Depot, and the Language Houses.

Currently, South Campus is a dynamic residential neighborhood consisting overwhelmingly of young renters under thirty-five, and specifically Chico State students. It is one of the most densely populated areas of the city. The intersection of Fifth and Ivy Streets is a neighborhood commercial core referred to locally as "Five and I".

Buildings listed as contributing to the Historic District 

The historic district consists of 114 individual buildings which have been named in the register as contributing to the historical district. They include:

The Language Houses consist of six houses on West Third Street which had previously been owned by Chico State University's Department of Foreign Languages and Literatures. The houses had been used as student housing with each house having a language theme. The houses had fallen into disrepair under university management of the properties, and the sale of the properties to a developer interested in restoring the historical nature of the houses was a drawn out matter requiring the intervention of the state legislature. Today the houses are privately owned, have been restored and are occupied student housing. The Language Houses are named:

H.W. Crew House (also called the Spanish House and Alpha Phi House)
Rouke-Halle House (also called the German House)
C.C. Richardson House (also called the Italian House)
J.V. Richardson House
Charles Ball House (also called the International House)
French House (also called the Kappa Sigma Delta House)

228 Ivy Street
319 West Fourth Street
322 Normal Avenue
324 West Sixth Street
325 Ivy Street
330 West Fourth Street
345 West Fifth Street
345 West Sixth Street
411 West Sixth Street
414 West Fourth Street
414 West Sixth Street
417 Normal Avenue
419 West Sixth Street
420 West Fourth Street
420 West Sixth Street
421 West Third Street
428 West Fifth Street
428 West Fourth Street
429 Normal Avenue
429 West Third Street
430 West Third Street
431 West Sixth Street
441 West Fourth Street
511 West Fifth Street
514 Ivy Street
518 West Sixth Street
519 West Fifth Street
527 West Fifth Street
527 West Sixth Street
529 Ivy Street
529 Normal Avenue
530 Normal Avenue
530 West Sixth Street
541 West Fifth Street
543 West Sixth Street
544 West Sixth Street
611 West Fourth Street
621 West Sixth Street
625 West Third Street
626 West Fourth Street
627 West Second Street
629 West Sixth Street
635 West Second Street
706 West Sixth Street
718 West Sixth Street
719 West Sixth Street
720 West Fourth Street
727 West Sixth Street
728 West Third Street
729 West Second Street
737 West Second Street
745 West Third Street
Abraham House
Allen-Sommer-Gage House
As You Like It
Bicknell Cottages
Bicknell House
Bidwell Chapel
Big Red Barn
C.C. Mathews House
Chester Cole Residence
Copeland Residence
Cosby-McLain Home
Costar House
Crosette House
Eames Cottages
Eames House
F.M. Jackson House
Fifth Street Rooming House
House of Vinson
J.F. Fordham House
Kate Bower House
Kennedy House
L.A. McIntosh House
Lizzie Crew Canfield House
Miller House
Notre Dame School
Nottleman House
Ormsby House
P.E. O'Hair House
Presbyterian Parsonage
Rev. Jesse Wood House
Reynolds House
Sapp Hall
Sherwood House
Sierra Hall
Stansbury House (Chico, California)
Theodore Schwein Home
W.H. Schooler House
Walker House
Waterland Apartments
White House

South Campus Neighborhood Association 

In September 1996, a group of residents, property owners, business owners, and student organization representatives got together to form the South Campus Neighborhood Association. This was, in part a result of the City Council, in May of that year, directing the Planning Commission to study zoning for "Student Living Groups" (i.e. fraternities and sororities, etc.). The group prepared a Constitution for the neighborhood association, and an outline for a neighborhood plan; both of which were presented at a neighborhood meeting in March 1997.

The association has successfully lobbied the city for increased lighting, infrastructure repairs (such as sidewalks), increased community involvement in police strategies, and amendments to the city's noise ordinance. The neighborhood association requested that the city consider creating a Special Events Permit, so as to address some of the issues arising from the youth of its residents. Although the city, did not establish such a permit, the proposed zone which was to be associated with this permit eventually was approved by the council as a unique Fraternity/Sorority Overlay Zone.

South Campus Fraternity/Sorority Overlay Zone 

The land use regulations in the zone are combined with those of the base district, except that fraternities and sororities shall be a permitted use, with the approval of a ministerial permit by the Planning Director.

Weblinks

References 

Neighborhoods in Chico, California
Historic districts on the National Register of Historic Places in California
Special districts of California
Student culture in the United States
National Register of Historic Places in Butte County, California